Sebastiani may refer to any of the following people:

Amedeo Sebastiani, best known as Amadeus, Italian television and radio presenter
Don Sebastiani, American politician
Franca Sebastiani, known early under the pseudonym Franchina, Italian singer
Horace François Bastien Sébastiani de La Porta, French diplomat, general and politician, brother of Tiburce
Jesse Sebastiani, Canadian YouTuber
Johann Sebastiani, German composer
Lorenzo Sebastiani, Italian rugby player
Luis Abilio Sebastiani Aguirre, Peruvian Catholic archbishop
Pablo Caballero Sebastiani, Uruguayan footballer
Paola Sebastiani, Italian biostatistician
Pía Sebastiani, Argentine pianist and composer
Sebastian Sebastiani, Italian sculptor and founder
Sergio Sebastiani, Italian cardinal
Tiburce Sébastiani, French general and politician, brother of Horace

Other
Brusqeulia sebastiani, species of moth of the family Tortricidae
Marginella sebastiani, species of sea snail, a marine gastropod mollusk in the family Marginellidae
Nanuca sebastiani, species of sea slug, a marine gastropod mollusc in the family Facelinidae
Turbonilla sebastiani, species of sea snail, a marine gastropod mollusk in the family Pyramidellidae
i Sebastiani, a Commedia dell'Arte theatre troupe formed in 1990